Tatsuya Fukuzawa (福澤 達哉 Fukuzawa Tatsuya, born July 1, 1986) is a retired Japanese volleyball player who played for Japan men's national volleyball team. He announced his retirement on July 14, 2021 and competed in the retirement match with Panasonic Panthers teammates on August 14, 2021.

Personal life 
He is married and has four daughters.

Clubs
  Rakuminami High School
  Chuo University (2004–2008)
  Panasonic Panthers (2009–2015)
  Copel Telecom (2015–2016)
  Panasonic Panthers (2016-2019)
  Paris Volley (2019–2021) (loaned)
  Panasonic Panthers (2021-2022)

Awards

Individuals
 2008-09 V.Premier League – "Rookie of the Year"
 2009: 58th Kurowashi Tournament – "Young Eagle Award (Rookie), Best 6"
 2009: Asian Championship "Most Valuable Player Award"
 2009: World Grand Champions Cup "Best Spiker"
 2009-10 V.Premier League – "Best 6"
 2010: 59th Kurowashi Tournament – "Best 6"
 2011-12 V.Premier League – "Most Valuable Player Award", "Best 6"
 2012-13 V.Premier League – "Best 6"
 2013: 62nd Kurowashi Tournament – "Best 6"
 2014: 63rd Kurowashi Tournament – "Best 6"

Team
 2009 Kurowashiki All Japan Volleyball Championship -  Champion, with Panasonic Panthers.
 2009-2010 V.Premier League -  Champion, with Panasonic Panthers.
 2010 Asian Club Championship –  3rd place, with Panasonic Panthers.
 2010 Kurowashiki All Japan Volleyball Championship -  Champion, with Panasonic Panthers.
 2011-2012 V.Premier League -  Champion, with Panasonic Panthers.
 2012 Kurowashiki All Japan Volleyball Championship -  Champion, with Panasonic Panthers.
 2012-2013 V.Premier League -  Runner-Up, with Panasonic Panthers.
 2013 Kurowashiki All Japan Volleyball Championship -  Runner-Up, with Panasonic Panthers.
 2013-2014 V.Premier League -  Champion, with Panasonic Panthers.
 2014 Kurowashiki All Japan Volleyball Championship -  Champion, with Panasonic Panthers.

National team

Senior Team
 2005: World League – 10th place
 2008: World League – 6th place
 2008: Summer Olympics – 11th place
 2009: World League – 15th place
 2009: Asian Championship –  Gold Medal
 2009: World Grand Champions Cup –  Bronze Medal
 2010: Asian Games –   Gold Medal
 2011: World League – 15th place
 2011: World Cup – 10th place
 2012: World League – 15th place
 2013: World League – 18th place
 2013: World Grand Champions Cup – 6th place
 2013: Asian Championship – 4th place

References

External links
 Tatsuya Fukuzawa (Chuo University)
 V-League official profile
 Panasonic Panthers Player Profiles

1986 births
Japanese men's volleyball players
Living people
Outside hitters
Sportspeople from Kyoto Prefecture
People from Western Tokyo
Chuo University alumni
Japanese expatriate sportspeople in France
Olympic volleyball players of Japan
Volleyball players at the 2008 Summer Olympics
Asian Games medalists in volleyball
Volleyball players at the 2010 Asian Games
Volleyball players at the 2014 Asian Games
Asian Games gold medalists for Japan
Asian Games silver medalists for Japan
Medalists at the 2010 Asian Games
Medalists at the 2014 Asian Games